Todor Todoroski (born 26 February 1999) is a Macedonian professional footballer who plays as a right back.

Career

Club career
Todoroski made his senior football debut on 20 April 2016 at the age of 17, by entering the game for Metalurg at the start of the second halftime in the First Macedonian Football League match against Renova. That season he went on to play two more games, which eventually brought him a transfer to FK Vardar in the following summer in 2016. Vardar initially signed him for their youth team, but in 2017 they eventually promoted him to the first team. Todor was regular in the upcoming 2017–18 and 2018–19 seasons, which caught the eye of Croatian side NK Osijek who decided to sign him at the beginning of 2019 to play for their second team. After successful 6 months playing for Osijek II in the Croatian Second Football League, in the summer of 2019 they decided to promote him to the first team. On 28 July 2019, he made his debut for the first Osijek team, having played the full game against Gorica in the second round of the 2019–20 Croatian First Football League.

International
Ever since 2014 Todoroski has been regular at most of North Macedonia's national youth teams.

He made his debut for North Macedonia national football team on 11 November 2021 in a World Cup qualifier against Armenia.

References

External links
 
 

1999 births
Living people
Sportspeople from Prilep
Association football fullbacks
Macedonian footballers
Macedonian expatriate footballers
North Macedonia youth international footballers
North Macedonia under-21 international footballers
North Macedonia international footballers
FK Metalurg Skopje players
FK Vardar players
NK Osijek players
HNK Šibenik players
FK Radnički Niš players
ŠKF Sereď players
Macedonian First Football League players
Croatian Football League players
First Football League (Croatia) players
Serbian SuperLiga players
Slovak Super Liga players
Expatriate footballers in Croatia
Macedonian expatriate sportspeople in Croatia
Expatriate footballers in Serbia
Macedonian expatriate sportspeople in Serbia
Expatriate footballers in Slovakia
Macedonian expatriate sportspeople in Slovakia